Líté is a municipality and village in Plzeň-North District in the Plzeň Region of the Czech Republic. It has about 200 inhabitants.

Administrative parts
The village of Spankov is an administrative part of Líté.

References

Villages in Plzeň-North District